Histories or, in Latin, Historiae may refer to:

 the plural of history
 Histories (Herodotus), by Herodotus
 The Histories, by Timaeus
 The Histories (Polybius), by Polybius
 Histories by Gaius Sallustius Crispus (Sallust), of which only fragments survive
 Histories (Tacitus), by Tacitus
Shakespeare's histories which define the theatrical genre History (theatrical genre)

Histories may also refer to:

History of novels, an early term for the then emerging novel
"Histories" (House), 10th episode in season 1 of House TV series
Horrible Histories, a series of children's books written by Terry Deary
Historians, those who write down an historical non-fiction
Histories (journal), a journal published by MDPI.

See also

 , a Japanese manga comic book by Hitoshi Iwaaki
 Historias, 1994 album by Ricardo Arjona
 Herstory, feminism

 Histoire (disambiguation)
 Historia (disambiguation)
 History (disambiguation)